The 30th annual Venice International Film Festival was held from 23 August to 5 September 1969. There was no jury because from 1969 to 1979 the festival was not competitive.

Films premiered
 Fellini Satyricon by Federico Fellini (Italy)
 La primera carga al machete by Manuel Octavio Gómez (Cuba)
 Zaseda by Zivojin Pavlovic (Yugoslavia)
 Blood of the Condor by Jorge Sanjinés (Bolivia)
 Čest a sláva by Hynek Bočan (Czechoslovakia)
 Cardillac by Edgar Reitz (West Germany)

Awards
Pasinetti Award
Best Foreign Film - Cest a sláva (Hynek Bocan)
Best Italian Film - Fellini Satyricon (Federico Fellini)
CIDALC Award
Zaseda (Zivojin Pavlovic)
Golden Rudder
Blood of the Condor (Jorge Sanjinés)
Luis Buñuel Award
'La primera carga al machete'' (Manuel Octavio Gómez)

References

External links
 
 Venice Film Festival 1969 Awards on IMDb

Venice International Film Festival
Venice International Film Festival
Venice Film Festival
Film
Venice International Film Festival
Venice International Film Festival